Stacy Margolin (born April 5, 1959) is a former American professional tennis player in the WTA tour and the ITF world tour from 1979 to 1987 whose career-high world singles ranking is No. 18 (career-high end of season ranking of No. 25 in 1979). In her eight professional seasons, Margolin competed in a total of twenty-five grand slam championships, which includes several appearances at Wimbledon, the US Open, and the French Open. She won a gold medal at the 1977 Maccabiah Games in Israel.

Margolin was a talented junior player, competing in numerous national tournaments, including multiple appearances at the Ojai Tennis Tournament. She played for the University of Southern California during her collegiate career and led the Trojans to a national championship. In her 192 career singles matches and 124 career doubles matches, Margolin won one title and has partnered with other notable players such as John McEnroe and Anne White.

Early life 
Beginning when she was 10 years old, Margolin played in numerous USTA junior tournaments, achieving a rank of No. 6 in the Under-12 division in Southern California. She was ranked No. 17 in the nation after competing in the USTA Under-14 Junior Tennis Team National Competition. In 1975, she reached the No. 1 rank in Southern California Girls Under-16 and continue to win the U.S. Under-18 Indoor Championship in 1976 and become the No. 1 Southern California Girls Under-18 and No. 5 U.S. Girls Under-18. Margolin would win the Ojai Tennis Tournament, the country's oldest amateur tennis tournament, seven times — U14s, U16s, U18s, Doubles, Women's Open (twice), and Collegiate Division.

High school and collegiate career 
At Beverly Hills High School, Margolin was not only the No. 1 women's singles player, but joined the men's varsity tennis team and became their No. 1 player as well.

She would then go on to be No. 1 women's singles player at the University of Southern California, where she went undefeated during her freshman and sophomore years in their dual home matches. She helped lead the USC Trojans to a USTA (1978) and an AIAW (1979) national team title. Margolin would become a two-time Collegiate All-American during those two years. As a freshman, she would become the USTA Collegiate Singles Champion.

Professional career 
In 1977, Margolin was the U.S. 21-and-Under Champion and was a member of the U.S. Team participating in the Junior Wightman Cup. She won the Ojai Tennis Tournament in women's singles. Additionally, she was the runner-up to Tracy Austin at Avon Futures of Portland. 

At the 1977 Maccabiah Games in Israel — a competition for Israeli and  Jewish athletes — Margolin won gold, silver (in women's singles, losing to Dana Gilbert), and bronze medals at various tennis events. She and Peter Rennert won the gold medal in mixed doubles, defeating South Africa's Ilana Kloss and Graham Silverman.

In 1978, she was the U.S. 21-and-under Amateur Hard Court Champion as well as a U.S. Team Member in the Federation Cup held in the United Kingdom. Margolin went on to defeat Tracy Austin to become the Women's Southern California Sectional Champion and was the Southern California Sectional Mixed Doubles Champion with her brother, Mike Margolin. Margolin won her first and only tour championship, the 1978 WTA's Women in Tennis International Singles Champion held in San Antonio, Texas.

After turning professional in 1979, she reached a career-high No. 18 world ranking and finished the 1979 season ranked No. 25. Margolin was consistently ranked in the top 40 between 1980 and 1984, and would go on to be a Wimbledon Plate quarter finalist and a semi-finalist in the Wells Fargo Open in San Diego. She continued to compete on the tour and participate in 25 grand slam championships, including the 1978 Wimbledon and U.S. Open mixed doubles, in which she was partnered with John McEnroe. In 1988 she again won the Ojai Tennis Tournament in women's singles.

Personal life 
After retiring from professional match play, Margolin earned a sociology degree from UCLA and a master's degree in clinical psychology from Pepperdine University. She became the Head Tennis Director of the Youth and Adult Recreation Department in Ojai, California, from 1995 to 1998. She then became a nutrition and wellness consultant/lecturer at the Weil Tennis Academy in Ojai, and was the head tennis coach of the boys and girls teams at the Thatcher School. Margolin self-published a book of poetry called Thoughts Allowed ... A Journey into a Woman's Mind, Heart & Soul in 2009. Currently, she works with her husband as a health coach in their hiking, biking, rock climbing, and tennis company, Trails by Potter.

Awards 
Margolin won the Tennis Teaching Pro Outstanding Service Award from 1986 to 1989. She was inducted into the Southern California Jewish Sports Hall of Fame in 2004 as well as the Beverly Hills High School Athletic Hall of Fame in 2009. She entered the ITA Women's Collegiate Tennis Hall of Fame in 2014.

WTA Tour finals

Singles (1-0)

Grand Slam record

Singles 

The result is on the right. The final opponent is on the left.

Doubles 

The result is on the right. The partner is below the result. The final opponent is on the left.

Mixed doubles 

The result is on the right. The partner is below the result. The final opponent is on the left.

Charity work 
Margolin organized the first Ojai Tennis Marathon in 2000, an event in which participants attempt to play fifty games of tennis in a single day to raise funding for the Ojai Valley Youth Foundation, of which Margolin's husband, Ian Potter, is on the board of directors. Margolin continues to organize the tennis marathon event as of 2015.

See also

List of select Jewish tennis players

References 

1959 births
Living people
American female tennis players
Beverly Hills High School alumni
USC Trojans women's tennis players
Tennis people from California
Maccabiah Games medalists in tennis
Maccabiah Games gold medalists for the United States
Maccabiah Games silver medalists for the United States
Maccabiah Games bronze medalists for the United States
Jewish tennis players
Jewish American sportspeople
Competitors at the 1977 Maccabiah Games
21st-century American Jews
21st-century American women